The  was an electric multiple unit (EMU) train type operated by the private railway operator Tokyu Corporation in Japan from 1958, and later by Ueda Kotsu until 1993.

Technical specifications
The outer structure of the car bodies was made of stainless steel. The trains are equipped with Toshiba SE-518 motors with a power output of 100kW, and TS-301 bogies.

History
The trains entered service on December 1, 1958, initially running on the Tōyoko Line, and were subsequently also used on the Den-en-toshi and Ōimachi lines.

Ueda Electric Railway
In 1986, former Tokyu 5200 series cars were transferred to Ueda Kotsu, where they stayed in service until 1993.

Preserved examples
Deha 5201: preserved at the J-TREC factory in Yokohama, Japan
Car 5251: preserved by Ueda Electric Railway

References

External links

Mechanical Engineering Heritage No.51 - The stainless steel railcars - Japan Society of Mechanical Engineers 

Electric multiple units of Japan
5200 series
Train-related introductions in 1958
1500 V DC multiple units of Japan
Tokyu Car multiple units